Todor Todorov (born 28 January 1948) is a Bulgarian weightlifter. He competed in the men's featherweight event at the 1976 Summer Olympics.

References

1948 births
Living people
Bulgarian male weightlifters
Olympic weightlifters of Bulgaria
Weightlifters at the 1976 Summer Olympics
Place of birth missing (living people)